Invej is a Serbian trading company headquartered in Belgrade.

Subdivisions
The company is the owner of: Happy TV (one of the leading commercial television stations in Serbia); Ratar (enterprise for the production of wheat products); Rubin a.d. (beverage industry); Milan Blagojević Smederevo (household appliances); Pekarska industrija (pastry industry); Vital (oil factory); Monus (cigarette factory); Medela (company for production of confectionery and food products); Sunce (oil factory); Kasina (hotel and club); Ideogram (DVD publishing company and synchronization); City Port (production and trade enterprise); and, Albus (home chemistry).

References

External links

Mass media companies of Serbia
Companies established in 1993
Companies based in Belgrade